WPA Rustic architecture is an architectural style from the era of the U.S. New Deal Works Project Administration. The WPA provided funding for architects to create a variety of buildings, including amphitheaters and lodges. WPA architecture is akin to National Park Service rustic architecture.

WPA Rustic, as opposed to National Park Service Rustic as utilized in most national parks, involves more demarcation between the building and the landscape.

The term has been used by the National Park Service's National Register of Historic Places program to describe many buildings and structures, including American Legion meeting halls and other buildings built by the WPA in the 1930s.

Examples
Examples include the following:

Arkansas
American Legion Hut-Des Arc
American Legion Post No. 121
Riggs-Hamilton American Legion Post No. 20

North Dakota
Grand Forks County Fairgrounds WPA Structures, Grand Forks, North Dakota

Oklahoma
American Legion Hut (Edmond, Oklahoma)
American Legion Hut (Tahlequah, Oklahoma)

See also
 PWA Moderne

References

External links

 01
American architectural styles
 
1930s architecture in the United States
Architecture